Tiffin University is a private university in Tiffin, Ohio. It was founded in 1888 and is accredited by the Higher Learning Commission. The university offers undergraduate and graduate degree programs at the main campus in Tiffin, Ohio; the University of Bucharest in Romania; and several locations in Ohio, including the Cleveland, Toledo, and Fremont areas, as well as online.

History 
Tiffin University began as the Commercial College, affiliated for 30 years with Heidelberg College, as a financially independent and separate division or college. It taught the business courses typically found in the popular commercial colleges of the day.

After breaking with Heidelberg College in 1917, the institution relocated to downtown Tiffin. It developed a full four-year curriculum, then added graduate programs, and has been accredited.

Academics 
Tiffin University offers undergraduate and graduate degrees in a variety of on-campus, off-campus and online formats. TU consists of three academic schools: the School of Arts & Sciences, School of Business and School of Criminal Justice & Social Sciences. The Richard C. Pfeiffer Library houses a growing collection of books supporting the university's curriculum. The library is a member of OPAL and OhioLink, which provides online access to a vast collection of books, eBooks and databases, as well as books from any of the 90 other libraries.

Graduate programs
Tiffin University graduate programs include a Master of Business Administration (MBA), Master of Education (MEd), Master of Humanities (MH), Master of Science (MS) and Master of Science in Criminal Justice (MSCJ). It also offers a Ph.D. in Global Leadership and Change utilizing an online format and contains limited residency requirements.

Accreditation
Tiffin University is accredited by the Higher Learning Commission, the Master of Business Administration program is accredited by Accreditation Council for Business Schools and Programs, the European Council for Business Education, and the education partnership is accredited by the National Council for Accreditation of Teacher Education.

Athletics
The Tiffin Dragons compete in the Great Midwest Athletic Conference (G-MAC). 

Men's Sports
Baseball
Basketball
Cross country
Esports
Football
Golf
Soccer
Tennis
Track & Field (indoor and outdoor)
Wrestling

Women's Sports
Basketball
Cross country
Esports
Golf
Lacrosse
Soccer
Softball
STUNT
Tennis
Track & Field (indoor and outdoor)
Volleyball
Wrestling

Music
Tiffin University's music program consists of more than 15% of the campus population participating in groups that specialize in popular and commercial styles of music, and also in traditional large bands and choirs. The majority of student-musicians are non-music majors, and all receive scholarships for their music activities. TU also offers a degree in commercial music in which students to focus on popular, jazz, rock, hip hop, and other commercial styles, and has achieved regional and national recognition for its pop a cappella and vocal jazz groups, and for incorporating hip hop performance into its music ensembles. All TU music majors receive free music notation and production software, and have liberal access to the school's multiple digital audio workstations for both their academic and independent music production activities. TU is home to the Lambda Iota chapter of the national honorary band fraternity Kappa Kappa Psi.

Campus life
Tiffin main campus is  enclosed in Tiffin, Ohio, the county seat of Seneca County, in northwestern Ohio. The campus is located on the west side of Tiffin, within a half mile of downtown Tiffin.

Architecture 
The campus environment includes over 25 buildings with a blend of traditional historic and modern structures.

Greek life
Tiffin University's Greek life includes:

Fraternities

Phi Theta Pi
Theta Eta Omicron

Sororities
Alpha Iota
Sigma Delta Sigma
Zeta Pi Beta

Notable alumni 
 Boris Bede, Canadian football player
 Rex Damschroder, member of Ohio House of Representatives
 Greg Freeman, football player 
 Gary R. Heminger, president and CEO of Marathon Petroleum
 Chris Ivory, former NFL running back and 2015 Pro Bowl selection
 Walt Jean, former professional American football player (1922–1927)
 Joe Macko, former professional baseball player.
 Jeffrey McClain, member of the Ohio House of Representatives 
 Antonio Pipkin, Canadian football player for the Montreal Alouettes
 Nate Washington, former NFL wide receiver for the Tennessee Titans and the Pittsburgh Steelers
 George Whitfield, Jr., personal coach for NFL and NCAA quarterbacks
 Sandra Williams, member of the Ohio House of Representatives

References

External links
 Official website
 Official athletics website

 
Educational institutions established in 1888
1888 establishments in Ohio
Education in Seneca County, Ohio
Buildings and structures in Seneca County, Ohio
Tourist attractions in Seneca County, Ohio
Private universities and colleges in Ohio